Terje Olsen (born 04.04.1965) (died 10.09.2018) was a former Norwegian football defender.

He joined Skeid from Oppsal in 1987, then Strømmen in 1990. In 1993 he went on to Vålerenga along with Espen Haug. He featured in 8 league games in 1995, then retired.

References

1965 births
Footballers from Oslo
Norwegian footballers
Skeid Fotball players
Strømmen IF players
Vålerenga Fotball players
Norwegian First Division players
Eliteserien players
Association football defenders
2018 deaths